Gardanne is a commune in the Bouches-du-Rhône department in southern France. Its inhabitants are called Gardannais.

Geography
It is close to Aix-en-Provence and Marseille and on the rail link connecting the two cities.

It is bordered by the Massif du Montaiguet, which expands to Luynes, Aix en Provence and Bouc-Bel-Air. It comprises chalky plateaux bordered by cliffs, forests of pines and oaks, and crops areas. In 1979 and 2005 the area was devastated by bush fires. Following these incidents, garrigue is now covering a wide area.

History
Walls dating back to the first century AD have been found.

In 1454 René d'Anjou bought the estate and would go there until 1480. In 1482 it was bought back by the Forbins and in 1676 the villagers themselves bought back their own land.

In the 1860s a railway was built and a little later mines were dug, thus attracting Italian, Armenian, Polish, Czech, Spanish and African workers to the village. The deep mine, one of the last surviving in France, was closed down in 2003.

Energy 
The Centrale thermique de Provence, a thermal power station is located in Gardanne. It runs on coal and biomass and uses the technology known as the circulating fluidized bed. It has the highest chimney in France which rises to 297 m. In 2018, the site director presented it as the third tallest building in France, after the Eiffel Tower and the Millau viaduct. The plant will be closed before 2022 in order to reduce greenhouse gas emissions in accordance with the PPE law.

Population

Politics
The commune of Gardanne was governed by the French Communist Party under Mayor Roger Meï from 1977 until 2020. Voting is usually towards the left-wing, but rather uncharacteristically, Nicolas Sarkozy gained 53.1% of the vote at the second round of the 2007 French presidential election.

Picture gallery

See also 
 Provence Power Station
 Communes of the Bouches-du-Rhône department
 Olivier Dubuquoy

References

External links

Official website 

Communes of Bouches-du-Rhône
Bouches-du-Rhône communes articles needing translation from French Wikipedia